Dog Bone Lake or Dogbone Lake may refer to:

Dog Bone Lake (Nevada)
Dogbone Lake (North Slope Borough, Alaska)
Dogbone Lake (Kenai Peninsula Borough, Alaska)